Wilhelmine Ernestine of Denmark and Norway (20 or 21 June 1650 – 22 or 23 April 1706) was an Electress of the Palatinate. She was the third of five daughters of King Frederick III of Denmark and Sophie Amalie of Brunswick-Lüneburg.

Biography
Her aunt, Electress Sophia of Hanover, arranged a marriage between Wilhelmina Ernestine and Sophia's nephew Charles, heir to the Electorate of the Palatinate. The negotiations of the marriage started in 1669. Wilhelmina Ernestine was betrothed at Sophie Amalienborg Palace in Denmark in the presence of Charles on 24 June 1671. On 14 August, Wilhelmina Ernestine left Denmark with a large Danish retinue for Heidelberg, where the wedding ceremony was conducted on 20 September 1671.

Wilhelmina Ernestine was granted a large dowry from Denmark, and she also received the towns of Germersheim and Oppenheim from her father-in-law, Elector Charles I Louis. During the Scanian War between Denmark and Sweden in 1679, Wilhelmine Ernestine loaned funds to her brother to finance the war.

The marriage was very unhappy. Charles had been forced by his father to marry her against his will and disliked the marriage from the beginning. Her shy behavior and physical appearance - she was said to have been somewhat crippled - only widened the distance between them. Wilhelmina Ernestine is not noted to have had any particular interests, she preferred solitude and a reclusive quiet life style in contrast to the active social life preferred by Charles, and she reportedly offended him by her pride over her royal status. By 1677, Charles' dislike made his father consider serious plans of a divorce, although these plans were never realized. They had no children.

On 28 August 1680, they became Elector and Electress of the Palatinate. Charles' reign was marked by his dependency on favorites. The Elector died 26 May 1685. As a widow, she lived with her sister, Dowager Electress Anna Sophie of Saxony, at Castle Lichtenburg in Saxony.

Ancestors

References

 Dansk biografisk Lexikon / XVIII. Bind. Ubbe - Wimpffen /  (in Danish)

|-

1650 births
1706 deaths
House of Oldenburg in Denmark
House of Palatinate-Simmern
Danish princesses
Norwegian princesses
Electresses of the Palatinate
Princesses of the Palatinate
Burials at Freiberg Cathedral
17th-century German women
17th-century German people
18th-century German women
Daughters of kings